NH Media (also known as NHemg) (NH stands for Nam Hee) is a South Korean entertainment agency founded in 1998 by Kim Nam-hee.

In May 2016, Signal Entertainment Group acquired 50% of the company.

Former artists
 UN (2000–2005)
 Paran (2005–2008)
 U-KISS
 Alexander Lee Eusebio (2008–2011)
 Allen Kim (2008–2011)
 Shin Dong-ho (2008–2013)
 AJ (2011–2016)
 Kevin Woo (2008–2017)
 Eli Kim (2008–2019)
 Lee Ki-seop (2009–2019)
 Soohyun (2008–2021)
 Hoon (2011–2021)
 Jun (2014–2021)
 Laboum (moved to Interpark Music Plus)
 Yulhee (2014–2017)
 Yujeong (2014–2021)
 Dahee
 Kim Jong-seo
 The Ray
 Soul LaTiDo
 Im Chang-jung
 Bang Eun-hee
 Oh You-me

Joint ventures
In 2013, NH Media announced that it had joined forces with Major Entertainment, whose main focus had been on managing actors and actresses. NH Media claimed that the joint agencies would increase their area of expertise. Kim Nam Hee, CEO Of NH Media, officially registered NH&Major1998 as an incorporation.

In 2014, NH Media and Nega Network formed a joint venture called "Global H".

Notes

References

Signal Entertainment Group
South Korean record labels
Talent agencies of South Korea
Record labels established in 1998
Labels distributed by Kakao M
Defunct record labels of South Korea